Novovolynsk is a city in Volyn Oblast, Ukraine. Novovolynsk, together with the urban-type settlement of Blahodatne (until 2016 Zhovtneve), is incorporated as Novovolynsk Municipality. Population: 

Located within the Lviv-Volyn coal basin until recently, Novovolynsk was a major coal mining center of the region. The city has a few factories: a ferroconcrete plant, brickworks, a plant for mining equipment maintenance, a meatpacking and bread factory, and a woodworking plant.

History
Novovolynsk was built in 1950 as a mining town in the USSR. It obtained city status in 1957. The word "Novovolynsk" is a morphological blend, meaning "a new town in the Volyn Oblast".

There is a monument to a famous Ukrainian poet and artist Taras Shevchenko in Novovolynsk. Prominent civil society activist Anna Garmash is also from Novovolynsk, as well as footballer Artem Fedetskyi.

The town is twinned with Hartlepool, England and Echirolles, France.

Geography
Novovolynsk is situated in the southwest of Volyn Oblast in the far north-west of Ukraine. The city area is about 17 square kilometers. The state border to Poland runs 15  km to the West from the city; 92  km to the North from Novovolynsk there is the state border to Belarus.

The city is well-situated. The distance to the national highway H22 Ustylug – Lutsk – Rivne is only 18  km. The distance to the international highway E373 (coincides with national M07) Warsaw – Lublin – Kovel – Sarny – Korosten – Kyiv is only 76  km.

Picture Gallery

References

Sources 
  Олександр Цинкаловський. Стара Волинь і Волинське Полісся. Краєзнавчий словник — від найдавніших часів до 1914 року. – V. 1.

External links 
 Novovolynsk ads
 Information portal of Novovolynsk
 Novovolynsk, Google maps

 
Cities in Volyn Oblast
 Populated places established in the Ukrainian Soviet Socialist Republic
 Mining cities and regions in Ukraine
 Cities of regional significance in Ukraine